The lost Tomb of Nebamun was an ancient Egyptian tomb from the Eighteenth Dynasty located in the Theban Necropolis located on the west bank of the Nile at Thebes (present-day Luxor) in Egypt. The tomb was the source of a number of famous decorated tomb scenes that are currently on display in the British Museum, London.

The location of the tomb was not revealed at the time of its discovery in order to maintain secrecy during a period of competition between excavators, and was since lost. Scientific analysis in 2008-09 indicated the tomb's location in the vicinity of Dra' Abu el-Naga'.

Discovery
Nebamun, who lived around 1350 BCE, was a middle-ranking official scribe and grain counter at the temple complex in Thebes. His tomb was discovered around 1820 by a young Greek, Giovanni ("Yanni") d'Athanasi, who at the time was working for Henry Salt, the British Consul-General.

Excavated artefacts
The tomb's plastered walls were richly and skilfully decorated with lively fresco paintings, depicting idealised views of Nebamun's life and activities. D'Athanasi and his workmen literally hacked out the pieces he wanted with knives, saws and crowbars. Salt sold these works to the British Museum in 1821, though some of the other fragments became located in Berlin and possibly Cairo. D'Athanasi later died in poverty without ever revealing the tomb's exact location.

The best-known of the tomb's paintings include Nebamun fowl hunting in the marshes, dancing girls at a banquet, and a pond in a garden. In 2009, the British Museum opened up a new gallery dedicated to the display of the restored eleven wall fragments from the tomb. They have been described as the greatest paintings from ancient Egypt to have survived, and as one of the Museum's greatest treasures.

Various scenes from the paintings have been used by artists in more modern times. Lawrence Alma-Tadema incorporated a scene of geese herding for a wall decoration depicted in his Joseph, Overseer of Pharaoh’s Granary (1874), and Paul Gauguin used part of a banquet scene as a compositional plan in his Ta Matete (1892)

Gallery

References

Bibliography 

 

Theban tombs
Ancient Egypt
Ancient history